Laurent Petitguillaume (born 21 February 1960 in Tours) is a French radio and television host. He debuted in 1983 on the RFM radio, then on Skyrock alongside Supernana, before hosting the show Duel au soleil on RTL during the summer holidays. He then presented various variety shows on television, including Scènes de ménage, Zygomusic, Que le meilleur gagne, La Fureur... He hosted the RFM Party 80 tour and is also the patron of several associations : Petits Princes and Ciel ma Sup' .

TV presenter
 Trivial Poursuit (France 2)
 Music Art (TF6)
 Le latino mag (RFM TV)
 72 heures (TF6)
 Le Kadox (France 3)
 Quelle galère (TF1)
 MCM news (MCM)
 Radio mag (MCM)
 Zygo Machine (M6)
 Hit 92 (M6)
 Ces années-là (France 2)
 Dance Machine (M6)
 Côté Maison (France 3)

TV series
 Léa Parker (M6)
 Sous le soleil (TF1)

Radio
 Sixième sens (RTL)
 Double appel (RTL)
 Tiroir secret (RTL)
 Challenges de l'été (RTL)
 Rio Bravo (RTL)
 Le Cékoidon (RTL)
 Le Quotidien 9h - 13h (RFM)
 Le Quotidien 16h - 20h (RTL2)

Theater
 Le molière malgré lui by Frédéric Smektala
 Des pommes pour Ève by Gabriel Arout

Filmography
 La gente Honrada by Bob Decout
 Prisme by Yves Brodsky
 Monsieur Guibolle by Francis Salomon
 Le renégat by Johan Lallemand and Julien Ferrand
 Philosophale by Farid Fedjer
 Y'a des jours comme çà by Cédric Bounkoulou
 L'étalon by Sébastien Mermoz
 Autour du cercle by Michael Alalouf

References

1960 births
French radio presenters
French television presenters
Living people
Mass media people from Tours, France